The Yancheng–Yixing intercity railway is a planned high-speed railway in Jiangsu, China. It is expected to have the following stations: Yancheng,  (reserved), Xinghua East, Taizhou South, Taixing East, Jingjiang East, Jiangyin, Huishan, Taihu West,  (reserved) and Yixing.

References

High-speed railway lines in China
Rail transport in Jiangsu